Edson T. Cady, along with Emory C. Ferguson, co-founded Cadyville in 1860 to take advantage of a military road Congress planned that never materialized.  Cadyville later became known as Snohomish, Washington.

E.T. Cady sailed from New York on the Nautilus on February 22, 1849, headed for California.  According to the 1862 Census of Snohomish County, taken by Sheriff Salem A. Woods, Cady was 34 years old and a native of Utica, New York. 

Cady Creek and Cady Pass, located in the Henry M. Jackson Wilderness, were named after the 1860 E.F. Cady exploring party.  The party was attempting to locate a railroad route over the North Cascades.

References
US Forest Service Retrieved July 16, 2005
1862 Snohomish County Census Retrieved July 16, 2005
The Argonauts of California Retrieved July 16, 2005
Stevens Pass: The Story of Railroading and Recreation in the North Cascades, by JoAnn Roe, as quoted on Alpenglow Ski History Retrieved July 16, 2005
City of Snohomish Retrieved July 16, 2005

People from Utica, New York
People from Snohomish, Washington
American city founders
History of Snohomish County, Washington